DYMK (93.5 FM), broadcasting as Barangay FM 93.5, is a radio station owned and operated by GMA Network. The station's studio is located at the GMA Broadcasting Complex, Phase 5, Alta Tierra Village, Jaro, Iloilo City, and its transmitter is located at the GMA Transmitter Complex, Brgy. Alaguisoc, Jordan, Guimaras.

History
The station was established in 1980 under the call letters DYXI with a smooth jazz format. In 1985, Asia-Pacific Broadcasting Company acquired the station from Allied Broadcasting Center, changed its callsign to DYMK and rebranded it as K-Lite with an easy listening format. In 1989, GMA jointly acquired the station and rebranded it as Campus Radio with a mass-based format. On February 17, 2014, as part of RGMA's brand unifying, the station rebranded as Barangay 93.5.

In 2010s DYMK-FM is a strongest FM station of Western Visayas with the power of 30 kW (75 kW ERP to 100 kW ERP) and the FM transmitter located in Jordan,Guimaras then FM station was reverted to current 10 kW power (60 kW ERP)

References

External links

Barangay FM stations
Radio stations in Iloilo City
Radio stations established in 1980